DFTBA Records, commonly known as DFTBA.com, is an e-commerce merchandise company that was co-founded by Hank Green and Alan Lastufka in 2008. Originally a record label, the company now focuses on selling merchandise for prominent YouTube content creators, such as Green himself, his brother the novelist John Green, Charlie McDonnell, CGP Grey, Kurzgesagt, and Charles Trippy, among several others.  DFTBA is an initialism for "don't forget to be awesome", a catchphrase of the Green brothers.

Name
The name of the company originates from the initialism "Don't Forget to Be Awesome". The initialism is generally seen as the motto for the VlogBrothers (consisting of Green, and his brother, John), as well as their fan base, known as Nerdfighteria. The original goal of the record label, as Lastufka stated in a video on the subject, is to provide a distribution network for talented artists of YouTube and to make sure their music reaches out to the "largest audience possible."

History

The offices of DFTBA Records were in Manhattan, Illinois, until early 2013 when they were relocated to Green's current residence, Missoula, Montana. In Illinois, the company had operated out of Lastufka's home. Upon moving to Missoula, they set up their warehouse in a small building that was formerly a preschool, but soon moved to a larger warehouse. During this time, they increased their number of employees from five to ten, and started another webseries called The Warehouse, hosted by warehouse manager Matthew Gaydos. This channel no longer uploads content as Matthew Gaydos is now working on other YouTube channels. Distribution of records by DFTBA Records is largely independent; Lastufka himself generally oversaw most of the distribution during his tenure as co-owner. On June 18, 2014, Lustufka announced his decision to sell his stake in the record label, and resigned as president, to pursue other projects. In April 2015, DFTBA Records was officially issued a business license in the city of Missoula.

In March 2014, several artists signed under DFTBA Records, including Alex Day and Tom Milsom, were involved in sexual abuse accusations. Following the breaking of this news, all artists that had been accused of having sexual encounters with their fans, or of being perpetrators of sexual abuse were dropped from the label. Lastufka also made a $1000 donation to the Rape, Abuse & Incest National Network.

Both Hank and John Green made public announcements on YouTube and Tumblr regarding the situation. Around the same time, a former DFTBA Record-signed artist, Michael Lombardo was sentenced to five years in prison due to pleading guilty on eleven counts of child pornography charges. Lombardo's ex-girlfriend, Hayley G. Hoover, who is also signed under DFTBA Records, spoke out against him.

Merchandise

DFTBA Records was originally founded as a music record label. However, the company now primarily sells merchandise, ranging from T-shirts to buttons.  Artists signed to DFTBA Records are not exclusively musical artists. For example, official The Fault in Our Stars merchandise was sold on the website, including a limited-edition box set including an audiobook version of the novel. Additionally, the artists responsible for the designs on merchandise, such as apparel or accessories, will receive royalties for their contributions.

Artists signed under the label have seen their shares of success, as well as unforeseen growth due to signing with the label, such as Craig Benzine and his band, Driftless Pony Club. In 2009, speaking about the artists signed under the label, Lastufka stated, "A lot of [our artists] are very nichey." Within two years, the record label was able to garner over $1 million in total sales, including music and merchandise.

References

External links
DFTBA Records Official Website

American record labels
DFTBA Records creators
Green brothers
Record labels established in 2008
Record labels based in Montana
American companies established in 2008